Caupolicán Ylich Ovalles Sequera, (Caracas, March 3, 1960), is a Venezuelan film director, producer and screenwriter. He was president of the Venezuelan Chamber of Feature Film Producers, being a member of the Board of Directors of the Premios Platino del Cine Iberoamericano, and Venezuela’s representative before the Ibero-American Federation of Film and Audiovisual Producers, between the years 2013 - 2018.
 
He was the scriptwriter, director and executive producer of the series for television Archivo Criminal (Criminal Archive) broadcast by Radio Caracas Televisión (RCTV), and winner of two awards "Dos de Oro". He was also the creator and producer of the Archivos del más Allá (Afterlife Archives) series, nominated in the category of Best International Television Series at the 2003 International Emmy Awards.
 
Within his role as a filmmaker, he was director, screenwriter and producer of the film Memorias de un Soldado  (Memoirs of a Soldier), his debut feature film, winner of 12 awards at the mayor film festivals in Venezuela and showcased at the XV Shanghai International Film Festival. 
 
In 2018  he premiered in Venezuela his second feature film, Muerte en Berruecos (Death in Berruecos)  a thriller that goes deep into investigations of the murder of the "Grand Marshal of Ayacucho" Antonio José de Sucre,  which occurred in June 1830. Later in 2019 the film was premiered in Ecuador and USA. In 2021, the film was a candidate for Best Ibero-American Film at the 35th edition of the Goya Awards.

Biography

Early life 
Caupolicán is the second of five siblings, born from the union between the venezuelan author, Rafael Honorio Caupolicán Ovalles Colmenares and founder of the Athenaeum of Barquisimeto and the Venezuelan Federation of Athenaeums, Ana Teresa Sequera. 
 
From an early age, he was raised surrounded by contrasts between political ideals, art, literature and culture in general. Thanks to the social circle in which his parents worked, Ovalles Sequera was always in touch with prominent figures, including directors, actors, writers, plastic artists and novelists, who were a relevant influence for his future career.

Studies 
During his teenage years, he spend his life living between different countries in Europe and Venezuela, studying high school in Spain and then returning to Caracas.
 
After reaching adulthood, in 1979 he decided to move to Milan (Italy) captivated by the great cultural, artistic and cinematographic movement going on during those times. In this city he began photography studies at the Istituto Europeo di Design, and later enrolled in the Centro di Formazione Professionale per la Técnica Cinetelevisiva, where he studied film and television direction and production, making his first documentaries, one of them about the La Scala Theater and another dedicated to Venice.
 
When he was 23 years old he completed his training in Italy and returns to Venezuela where he films Los Caminos de Hierro (The Iron Roads), a documentary about the history of the railways in Venezuela. This work was awarded as the Best Cultural Documentary by the National Short Film Festival Manuel Trujillo Durán, in 1985.
 
While living in his country, he continued his professional training at the Universidad Nacional Experimental Simón Rodríguez, where he earned an Audiovisual Education’s degree and began a career by working in emblematic television documentaries produced by the oil company Lagoven, and working as an independent filmmaker for Radio Caracas Televisión.
 
In 1993 he traveled to Los Angeles to conduct various workshops at the University of California on scripts writing, programming and budgeting. In 2005 he joined the RCTV Film and Television Academy, where he studied "Effective management skills" and "Project definition, planning and monitoring". Subsequently, in 2009 he joined the Film Media Business School in Rio de Janeiro,   in 2012 he completed a Master's Degree as a Digital Cinema Director and Producer at the University of La Laguna de Tenerife (Spain).

Career 
In the early stages of his career, he worked as documentaries director  and producer for the television series Cuadernos Lagoven en la pantalla, of which two episodes won awards at national film festivals: Los caminos de hierro (The Iron Roads) at the Manuel Trujillo Durán Festival (1985) and El llanero, at the Festival Nacional de Cine de Mérida (National Film Festival of Mérida) (1995).
 
In 1990 he joined PRISMAVISION C.A. as executive producer of international feature films, where he produced in Venezuela the following productions:
 
•         American ninja V para Cannon Pictures (USA) / International Movie Services (Italy)
 
•         Le gorille for Dolly Films y RAI (Italy)
 
•         Wins for Cannon Pictures (USA) / International Movie Services (Italy)
 
From 1995 to 2002, he worked as an independent producer at Radio Caracas Televisión (RCTV) and in 2003 he joined the network as production manager. In 2005 he was promoted to Independent & External Productions and Co-productions Manager, being responsible for the compliance of the Law on Social Responsibility on Radio and Television by the network, as well as for the development of the production of different drama series and telefilms, including hits such as La rumba del fin del mundo (2005), María Lionza (2006) and Señor Presidente (2007).

Guild Activity 
Ovalles has been involved in the training and diffusion of productions, and activities related to the national and international cinematographic guild, being a member of the board of directors of the Asociación Nacional de Autores Cinematográficos - ANAC (National Association of Cinematic Authors) and President of the Venezuelan Chamber of Feature Films Producers (CAVEPROL) from 2011 to 2016.
 
Likewise, he was president and is a member of the Committee responsible for selecting the Venezuelan film nominated for the Oscar Awards. He also is the representative of Venezuela before the Ibero-American Federation of Cinematographic and Audiovisual Producers (Federación Iberoamericana de Productores Cinematográficos y Audiovisuales - FIPCA), was a member of its board of directors, and is currently a Jury of the Platinum Awards of Ibero-American Cinema.
 
Caupolicán  is also one of the founders of the Venezuelan Film Academy (Academia de Cine de Venezuela - ACACV), in which he acts as president. He is a founding member of the Ibero-American Federation of Film Academies (Federación Iberoamericana de Academias de Cine  - FIACINE) and President of the Hispanic Independent Producers of America (HIPA)

Filmography

Short films

Feature films

TV films

Documentaries, shows and TV series

Awards and nominations

References 

Venezuelan film directors
Venezuelan screenwriters
Venezuelan film producers
Artists from Caracas
1960 births
Living people